Dr. NTR Beach Road, or simply known as Beach Road is a major roadway in Visakhapatnam. It is home to tourist destinations such as RK Beach and Kailasagiri. The Beach Road has cultural importance with the presence of buildings and structures such as, Rajiv Smruthi Bhavan (city's cultural hub), Annamayya Mandapam, AU Convention Center and organising rallies, city parades etc.

Development works 

The Visakhapatnam beach road to Bhimli will be developed at a cost of Rs 200 crore to promote tourism as a part of the city project "Vizag to develop beach road under smart city project."

References 

Tourist attractions in Visakhapatnam
Roads in Visakhapatnam
Neighbourhoods in Visakhapatnam